The 1919–20 season was Stoke's 20th season in the Football League and the second in the Second Division.

With the country back to normal after the hostilities in Europe, a full league programme was restored for the 1919–20 season and Stoke were able to take their place back in the Football League since 1908. Stoke had an up and down season as they went on runs of victories and then runs of defeats and unsurprisingly finished in a mid table position of 10th. The 1919–20 season also saw the Potteries derby become a league fixture as local club Port Vale were elected into the football league due to the expulsion of Leeds City. Stoke won the first league meeting between the two clubs 3–0 at Vale's Old Recreation Ground.

Season review

League
During the war Stoke had some success as they impressed in the Lancashire section of the war league. There was of course sadness as seven players died fighting in the war.  These were goalkeeper Richard Herron, half-backs Henry Hargreaves and Stan Ripley and reserve team players George Limer, Jack Shorthouse, Tom Kinson and Bill Nixon. Stoke's exploits in the War-League not only brought prestige and standing, but also swelled the coffers to the extent of financial stability. It was hoped that the club was set from a bright future and, with virtually everyone retained who had acquitted themselves so well in the war period, promotion was the target. Two Scottish players George Jarvis (from Celtic) and Jock Stirling (from Bradford Park Avenue) joined the forward ranks, whilst goalkeeper Tom Kay became first choice keeper and would go on to make 70 successive appearances.

The 1919–20 season opened well with good sized crowds being entertained by a winning team. Stoke collected maximum points in eleven of the first 15 matches and they only failed to score in one. Bob Whittingham, who had been such a stalwart during the war, rejoined the club on a permanent transfer from Chelsea and at the same time (October) David Brown arrived from Dundee to give Stoke's forward line an impressive look. But amazingly and completely out of context, Stoke's fortunes took a dramatic turn as they lost the next five matches. The team did manage to recover and in the end finished in 10th spot. A mid-table position was acceptable since the club had sought, initially, to consolidate its position in the Second Division. But the supporters were disappointed with the end result after such a good start to the season.

FA Cup
Fellow Second Division side Bury defeated Stoke in the first round 2–0.

Final league table

Results
Stoke's score comes first

Legend

Football League Second Division

FA Cup

Squad statistics

References

Stoke City F.C. seasons
Stoke